Ralph Lewin (born May 21, 1953) is a Swiss politician and the former president of the Cantonal Executive of the Canton of Basel-City since 2004. Since 2009, Lewin served on the board of directors for Cantonal. He is a member of the Social Democratic Party of Switzerland.

Career

Lewin graduated from the University of Basel in 1977 with a degree in Sociology and Macroeconomics. In 1984 Lewin began a two-year run as a member of the Swiss delegation to the OECD in Paris.

Lewin was the Governing Councilor and Chairman of the Department of Economic and Social Affairs of Basel-City Canton from 1997 to 2009. Lewin became the President of the Cantonal Executive of the Canton of Basel-City for several years.  In that span, Lewin was a MCH Messe Schweiz AG board member and a Basel-City Transport Authority member (chairman from 1997 through 2005). 

In 2009 Lewin became the President of the Foundation Board of the Sympany Insurance Group. Three months later, Lewin became President of the Swiss Association of Shipping and Port Industrie. 

Lewin was on the board of directors for Banque Coop SA until 2017. He also served on the board of directors for Basler Kantonalbank (BSKP.S).

References

External links
Lewin's homepage

Social Democratic Party of Switzerland politicians
1953 births
Living people
Politicians from Basel-Stadt
University of Basel alumni
21st-century Swiss politicians